Several ships of the French Navy have been named Roland; these include:

, a 64-gun ship of the line
, an unprotected cruiser built in the 1870s

See also
 

French Navy ship names